Microwave chemistry is the science of applying microwave radiation to chemical reactions. Microwaves act as high frequency electric fields and will generally heat any material containing mobile electric charges, such as polar molecules in a solvent or conducting ions in a solid.  Polar solvents are heated as their component molecules are forced to rotate with the field and lose energy in collisions. Semiconducting and conducting samples heat when ions or electrons within them form an electric current and energy is lost due to the electrical resistance of the material. Microwave heating in the laboratory began to gain wide acceptance following papers in 1986, although the use of microwave heating in chemical modification can be traced back to the 1950s.  Although occasionally known by such acronyms as MAOS (microwave-assisted organic synthesis), MEC (microwave-enhanced chemistry) or MORE synthesis (microwave-organic reaction enhancement), these acronyms have had little acceptance outside a small number of groups.

Heating effect
Conventional heating usually involves the use of a furnace or oil bath, which heats the walls of the reactor by convection or conduction. The core of the sample takes much longer to achieve the target temperature, e.g. when heating a large sample of ceramic bricks.

Acting as internal heat source, microwave absorption is able to heat the target compounds without heating the entire furnace or oil bath, which saves time and energy. It is also able to heat sufficiently thin objects throughout their volume (instead of through its outer surface), in theory producing more uniform heating. However, due to the design of most microwave ovens and to uneven absorption by the object being heated, the microwave field is usually non-uniform and localized superheating occurs. Microwave volumetric heating (MVH)  overcomes the uneven absorption by applying an intense, uniform microwave field.

Different compounds convert microwave radiation to heat by different amounts. This selectivity allows some parts of the object being heated to heat more quickly or more slowly than others (particularly the reaction vessel).

Microwave heating can have certain benefits over conventional ovens:
 reaction rate acceleration
 milder reaction conditions
 higher chemical yield
 lower energy usage
 different reaction selectivities

Microwave chemistry is applied to organic chemistry  and to inorganic chemistry.

Selective heating
A heterogeneous system (comprising different substances or different phases) may be anisotropic if the loss tangents of the components are considered. As a result, it can be expected that the microwave field energy will be converted to heat by different amounts in different parts of the system. This inhomogeneous  energy dissipation means selective heating of different parts of the material is possible, and may lead to temperature gradients between them. Nevertheless, the presence of zones with a higher temperature than others (called hot spots) must be subjected to the heat transfer processes between domains. Where the rate of heat conduction is high between system domains, hot spots would have no long-term existence as the components rapidly reach thermal equilibrium. In a system where the heat transfer is slow, it would be possible to have the presence of a steady state hot spot that may enhance the rate of the chemical reaction within that hot zone.

On this basis, many early papers in microwave chemistry postulated the possibility of exciting specific molecules, or functional groups within molecules.  However, the time within which thermal energy is repartitioned from such moieties is much shorter than the period of a microwave wave, thus precluding the presence of such 'molecular hot spots' under ordinary laboratory conditions. The oscillations produced by the radiation in these target molecules would be instantaneously transferred by collisions with the adjacent molecules, reaching at the same moment the thermal equilibrium. Processes with solid phases behave somewhat differently. In this case much higher heat transfer resistances are involved, and the possibility of the stationary presence of hot-spots should be contemplated. A differentiation between two kinds of hot spots has been noted in the literature, although the distinction is considered by many to be arbitrary. Macroscopic hot spots were considered to comprise all large non-isothermal volumes that can be detected and measured by use of optical pyrometers (optical fibre or IR).  By these means it is possible to visualise thermal inhomogeneities within solid phases under microwave irradiation. Microscopic hot spots are non-isothermal regions that exist at the micro- or nanoscale (e.g. supported metal nanoparticles inside a catalyst pellet) or in the molecular scale (e.g. a polar group on a catalyst structure). The distinction has no serious significance, however, as microscopic hotspots such as those proposed to explain catalyst behaviour in several gas-phase catalytic reactions have been demonstrated by post-mortem methods and in-situ methods. Some theoretical and experimental approaches have been published towards the clarification of the hot spot effect in heterogeneous catalysts.

A different specific application in synthetic chemistry is in the microwave heating of a binary system comprising a polar solvent and a non-polar solvent obtain different temperatures. Applied in a phase transfer reaction a water phase reaches a temperature of 100 °C while a chloroform phase would retain a temperature of 50 °C, providing the extraction as well of the reactants from one phase to the other. Microwave chemistry is particularly effective in dry media reactions.

Microwave effect
There are two general classes of microwave effects:
 Specific microwave effects.
 Non-thermal microwave effects.

A review has proposed this definition and examples of microwave effects in organic chemistry have been summarized.

Specific microwave effects are those effects that cannot be (easily) emulated through conventional heating methods. Examples include: (i) selective heating of specific reaction components, (ii) rapid heating rates and temperature gradients, (iii) the elimination of wall effects, and (iv) the superheating of solvents. Microwave-specific effects tend not to be controversial and invoke "conventional" explanations (i.e. kinetic effects) for the observed effects.

Non-thermal microwave effects have been proposed in order to explain unusual observations in microwave chemistry. As the name suggests, the effects are supposed not to require the transfer of microwave energy into thermal energy. Such effects are controversial.

Catalysis 
Application of microwave heating to heterogeneous catalysis reactions has not been explored intensively due to presence of metals in supported catalysts and possibility of arcing phenomena in the presence of flammable solvents. However, this scenario becomes unlikely using nanoparticle-sized metal catalysts.

References

External links 
 AMPERE (Association for Microwave Power in Europe for Research and Education)
 Microwave Synthesis @ organic-chemistry.org
 homepages uconn.edu site with microwave equipment and research